Jianshui County (Hani: Jeifsyu) is a city in Honghe prefecture, Yunnan province, China.  and remains an important transportation crossroad. Previously, it has been known as Lin'an or Huili; today, the name Lin'an Town is retained by Jianshui's county seat.

Geography

To the east lies Jijie, to the west Shiping, to the southeast Gejiu and Yuanyang, to the north Tonghai.

Administrative divisions
Jianshui County has 8 towns and 6 townships. 
8 towns

6 townships

Climate

Tourist attractions
Chao Yang Lou (Old East City Gate), Formerly known as Yinghuimen, Located at the eastern end of Lin'an Road, southeast of the county town. Built in the 22nd year of Hongwu in the Ming Dynasty (1389).
Hutongs or 'old neighbourhoods' with cobbled streets and stone wells.
Temple of Confucius, Jianshui - one of the largest Confucian temples in China, after that of Qufu, Shandong, Confucius' home town.
Shuanglong Bridge (pinyin 'shuang long qiao'), commonly known as Seventeen Span Bridge, a Qing Dynasty bridge outside of the town. It is located  five kilometers west of the town, where the Minjiang River and the Luochong River meet.
Zhu's Garden, The restored Qing Dynasty The homes and ancestral homes built by the brothers Zhu Xiqing in the late Qing Dynasty.
Ancient Buddhist towers, like Chongwen Tower.
Tuanshan Residence, an ancient Yi village which is located 13 kilometers west of Jianshui Ancient City.
The Swallow Cave, Located in the mountain gorge 22 kilometers east of Jianshui County, Named after a million large white-waisted swallows nest in the cave.

References

External links

 
 Jianshui County Official Website
 Photos of Jianshui tourist attractions

County-level divisions of Honghe Prefecture
Tourism in Yunnan